Series 32 of Top Gear, a British motoring magazine and factual television programme, was broadcast in the United Kingdom on BBC One and BBC One HD during summer 2022. It was the sixth series to feature the presenting line-up of Chris Harris, Paddy McGuinness, and Freddie Flintoff, the fourth to be broadcast on BBC One, and the final series to be produced before production moved to Bristol for the thirty-third series.

Episodes

Notes

References

External links
 Series 32 at the Internet Movie Database
 Episode list
 BBC Media Centre series overview

2022 British television seasons
Top Gear seasons